EBC YoYo, also known as YoYo TV, is a Taiwanese children's cable channel, operated by Eastern Television.

Animation

Japan 
 Pocket Monsters（001～XY051）
 Yume no Crayon Oukoku
 Magical Circle Guru Guru
 Paboo & Mojies
 Happy Kappy
 Yu-Gi-Oh!
 Pretty Cure
 Hello Kitty Paradise
 Hamtaro
 Mermaid Melody Pichi Pichi Pitch
 Mermaid Melody Pichi Pichi Pitch Pure
 Chibi Maruko-chan
 Shinkansen Henkei Robo Shinkalion
 Ox Tales

South Korea 
 Mix Master
 Canimals

United Kingdom 
 In the Night Garden...

Italy 
 Winx Club
 Calimero

New Zealand 
 Oscar and Friends

Program 
 Kamen Rider 555
 Kamen Rider Blade
 K-tai Investigator 7
 Tomica Hero: Rescue Force
 Tomica Hero: Rescue Fire
 Samurai Sentai Shinkenger
 Kamen Rider W
 Teletubbies
 The M Riders
 Miss No Good

EBC Yoyo TV Asia

 'EBC YoYo' , is Taiwan Eastern Television one of its cable channels.YoYo TV Asia is the award-winning high-quality preschool channel, the No.1 Taiwan parenting channel.

EBC Yoyo TV Asia is Aired Domestic Channels Originals Classic Programmes, Also Aired some Acquired Animation Shows, 24 Hours Nonstop Aired Children's Programme from 3-12 Years Old, The Channel Available in Hong Kong, Macau, Indonesia.

References

External links

Television channels and stations established in 1998